In mathematics, the classical orthogonal polynomials are the most widely used orthogonal polynomials: the Hermite polynomials, Laguerre polynomials, Jacobi polynomials (including as a special case the Gegenbauer polynomials, Chebyshev polynomials, and Legendre polynomials).

They have many important applications in such areas as mathematical physics (in particular, the theory of random matrices), approximation theory, numerical analysis, and many others.

Classical orthogonal polynomials appeared in the early 19th century in the works of Adrien-Marie Legendre,  who introduced the Legendre polynomials. In the late 19th century, the study of continued fractions to solve the moment problem by P. L. Chebyshev and then A.A. Markov and T.J. Stieltjes led to the general notion of orthogonal polynomials.

For given polynomials  and  the classical orthogonal polynomials  are characterized by being solutions of the differential equation 

with to be determined constants .

There are several more general definitions of orthogonal classical polynomials; for example,  use the term for all polynomials in the Askey scheme.

Definition 

In general, the orthogonal polynomials  with respect to a weight  satisfy

The relations above define  up to multiplication by a number. Various normalisations are used to fix the constant, e.g.

The classical orthogonal polynomials correspond to the following three families of weights:

The standard normalisation (also called standardization) is detailed below.

Jacobi polynomials

For  the Jacobi polynomials are given by the formula

They are normalised (standardized) by

and satisfy the orthogonality condition

The Jacobi polynomials are solutions to the differential equation

Important special cases 

For , these are called the Legendre polynomials (for which the interval of orthogonality is [−1, 1] and the weight function is simply 1):

For , one obtains the Chebyshev polynomials (of the second and first kind, respectively).

Hermite polynomials

The Hermite polynomials are defined by

They satisfy the orthogonality condition

and the differential equation

Laguerre polynomials

The generalised Laguerre polynomials are defined by

 

They satisfy the orthogonality relation

 

and the differential equation

Differential equation 

The classical orthogonal polynomials arise from a differential equation of the form

where Q is a given quadratic (at most) polynomial, and L is a given linear polynomial.  The function f, and the constant λ, are to be found.

(Note that it makes sense for such an equation to have a polynomial solution.
Each term in the equation is a polynomial, and the degrees are consistent.)

This is a Sturm–Liouville type of equation.  Such equations generally have singularities in their solution functions f except for particular values of λ.  They can be thought of as eigenvector/eigenvalue problems:  Letting D be the differential operator, and changing the sign of λ, the problem is to find the eigenvectors (eigenfunctions) f, and the
corresponding eigenvalues λ, such that f does not have singularities and D(f) = λf.

The solutions of this differential equation have singularities unless λ takes on
specific values.  There is a series of numbers λ0, λ1, λ2, ... that led to a series of polynomial solutions P0, P1, P2, ... if one of the following sets of conditions are met:

 Q is actually quadratic, L is linear, Q has two distinct real roots, the root of L lies strictly between the roots of Q, and the leading terms of Q and L have the same sign.
 Q is not actually quadratic, but is linear, L is linear, the roots of Q and L are different, and the leading terms of Q and L have the same sign if the root of L is less than the root of Q, or vice versa.
 Q is just a nonzero constant, L is linear, and the leading term of L has the opposite sign of Q.

These three cases lead to the Jacobi-like, Laguerre-like, and Hermite-like polynomials, respectively.

In each of these three cases, we have the following:

 The solutions are a series of polynomials P0, P1, P2, ..., each Pn having degree n, and corresponding to a number λn.
 The interval of orthogonality is bounded by whatever roots Q has.
 The root of L is inside the interval of orthogonality.
 Letting , the polynomials are orthogonal under the weight function 
 W(x) has no zeros or infinities inside the interval, though it may have zeros or infinities at the end points.
 W(x) gives a finite inner product to any polynomials.
 W(x) can be made to be greater than 0 in the interval.  (Negate the entire differential equation if necessary so that Q(x) > 0 inside the interval.)

Because of the constant of integration, the quantity R(x) is determined only up to an arbitrary positive multiplicative constant.  It will be used only in homogeneous differential equations
(where this doesn't matter) and in the definition of the weight function (which can also be
indeterminate.)  The tables below will give the "official" values of R(x) and W(x).

Rodrigues' formula  

Under the assumptions of the preceding section,
Pn(x) is proportional to 

This is known as Rodrigues' formula, after Olinde Rodrigues.  It is often written

where the numbers en depend on the standardization.  The standard values of en will be given in the tables below.

The numbers λn
Under the assumptions of the preceding section, we have

Second form for the differential equation 
Let

Then

Now multiply the differential equation

by R/Q, getting

or

This is the standard Sturm–Liouville form for the equation.

Third form for the differential equation
Let 

Then

Now multiply the differential equation

by S/Q, getting

or

But , so

or, letting u = Sy,

Formulas involving derivatives 
Under the assumptions of the preceding section, let P denote the r-th derivative of Pn.
(We put the "r" in brackets to avoid confusion with an exponent.)
P is a polynomial of degree n − r.  Then we have the following:

 (generalized Rodrigues' formula) P is proportional to 
 (differential equation, second form) P is a solution of 

There are also some mixed recurrences.  In each of these, the numbers a, b, and c depend on n
and r, and are unrelated in the various formulas.

 
 
 

There are an enormous number of other formulas involving orthogonal polynomials
in various ways.  Here is a tiny sample of them, relating to the Chebyshev,
associated Laguerre, and Hermite polynomials:

Orthogonality 

The differential equation for a particular λ may be written (omitting explicit dependence on x)

multiplying by  yields

and reversing the subscripts yields

subtracting and integrating:

but it can be seen that

so that:

Derivation from differential equation 

All of the polynomial sequences arising from the differential equation above are equivalent, under scaling and/or shifting of the domain, and standardizing of the polynomials, to more restricted classes.  Those restricted classes are exactly "classical orthogonal polynomials".

 Every Jacobi-like polynomial sequence can have its domain shifted and/or scaled so that its interval of orthogonality is [−1, 1], and has Q = 1 − x2.  They can then be standardized into the Jacobi polynomials .  There are several important subclasses of these: Gegenbauer, Legendre, and two types of Chebyshev.
They can then be standardized into the Associated Laguerre polynomials . The plain Laguerre polynomials  are a subclass of these.
They can then be standardized into the Hermite polynomials .

Because all polynomial sequences arising from a differential equation in the manner
described above are trivially equivalent to the classical polynomials, the actual classical
polynomials are always used.

Jacobi polynomial 
The Jacobi-like polynomials, once they have had their domain shifted and scaled so that
the interval of orthogonality is [−1, 1], still have two parameters to be determined.
written .  We have  and
.
(This puts the root of L inside the interval of orthogonality.)

are not symmetrical about x = 0.

The differential equation

is Jacobi's equation.

For further details, see Jacobi polynomials.

Gegenbauer polynomials 
They are written , and defined as

We have  and
.
The parameter  is required to be greater than −1/2.

(Incidentally, the standardization given in the table below would make no sense for α = 0 and n ≠ 0, because it would set the polynomials to zero.  In that case, the accepted standardization sets  instead of the value given in the table.)

Ignoring the above considerations, the parameter  is closely related to the derivatives of :

or, more generally:

For further details, see Gegenbauer polynomials.

Legendre polynomials 
The differential equation is

This is Legendre's equation.

The second form of the differential equation is:

The recurrence relation is

A mixed recurrence is

Rodrigues' formula is

For further details, see Legendre polynomials.

Associated Legendre polynomials 
The Associated Legendre polynomials, denoted

The m in parentheses (to avoid confusion with an exponent) is a parameter.  The m in brackets denotes the m-th derivative of the Legendre polynomial.

These "polynomials" are misnamed—they are not polynomials when m is odd.

They have a recurrence relation:

For fixed m, the sequence  are orthogonal over [−1, 1], with weight 1.

For given m,  are the solutions of

Chebyshev polynomials 
The differential equation is

This is Chebyshev's equation.

The recurrence relation is

Rodrigues' formula is

These polynomials have the property that, in the interval of orthogonality,

(To prove it, use the recurrence formula.)

This means that all their local minima and maxima have values of −1 and +1, that is, the polynomials are "level".  Because of this, expansion of functions in terms of Chebyshev polynomials is sometimes used for polynomial approximations in computer math libraries.

Some authors use versions of these polynomials that have been shifted so that the interval of orthogonality is [0, 1] or [−2, 2].

There are also Chebyshev polynomials of the second kind, denoted 

We have:

For further details, including the expressions for the first few
polynomials, see Chebyshev polynomials.

Laguerre polynomials 
The most general Laguerre-like polynomials, after the domain has been shifted and scaled, are the Associated Laguerre polynomials (also called generalized Laguerre polynomials), denoted .  There is a parameter , which can be any real number strictly greater than −1.  The parameter is put in parentheses to avoid confusion with an exponent.  The plain Laguerre polynomials are simply the  version of these:

The differential equation is

This is Laguerre's equation.

The second form of the differential equation is

The recurrence relation is

Rodrigues' formula is

The parameter  is closely related to the derivatives of :

or, more generally:

Laguerre's equation can be manipulated into a form that is more useful in applications:

is a solution of

This can be further manipulated.  When  is an integer, and :

is a solution of

The solution is often expressed in terms of derivatives instead of associated Laguerre polynomials:

This equation arises in quantum mechanics, in the radial part of the solution of the Schrödinger equation for a one-electron atom.

For further details, including the expressions for the first few polynomials, see Laguerre polynomials.

Hermite polynomials 

The differential equation is

This is Hermite's equation.

The second form of the differential equation is

The third form is

The recurrence relation is

Rodrigues' formula is

The first few Hermite polynomials are

One can define the associated Hermite functions

 

Because the multiplier is proportional to the square root of the weight function, these functions

The third form of the differential equation above, for the associated Hermite functions, is

The associated Hermite functions arise in many areas of mathematics and physics.
In quantum mechanics, they are the solutions of Schrödinger's equation for the harmonic oscillator.
They are also eigenfunctions (with eigenvalue (−i n) of the continuous Fourier transform.

If the notation He is used for these Hermite polynomials, and H for those above, then these may be characterized by

For further details, see Hermite polynomials.

Characterizations of classical orthogonal polynomials

There are several conditions that single out the classical orthogonal polynomials from the others.

The first condition was found by Sonine (and later by Hahn), who showed that (up to linear changes of variable) the classical orthogonal polynomials are the only ones such that their derivatives are also orthogonal polynomials.

Bochner characterized classical orthogonal polynomials in terms of their recurrence relations.

Tricomi characterized classical orthogonal polynomials as those that have a certain analogue of the Rodrigues formula.

Table of classical orthogonal polynomials 

The following table summarises the properties of the classical orthogonal polynomials.

See also 

 Appell sequence
 Askey scheme of hypergeometric orthogonal polynomials
 Polynomial sequences of binomial type
 Biorthogonal polynomials
 Generalized Fourier series
 Secondary measure
 Sheffer sequence
 Umbral calculus

Notes

References 
 

 

 

Articles containing proofs
Orthogonal polynomials
Special hypergeometric functions

zh:正交多項式